George Henry Ingouville,  (7 October 1826 – 13 January 1869) was a sailor in the Royal Navy and a recipient of the Victoria Cross, the highest award for gallantry in the face of the enemy that can be awarded to British and Commonwealth forces.

Victoria Cross
George Ingouville was born at St. Saviour, Jersey Channel Islands. He was 28 years old, and a Captain of the Mast in the Royal Navy during the Crimean War. Captain of the Mast Ingouville, although wounded, jumped overboard, swam round to the boat's bows, took hold of the painter and tried to turn the cutter out to sea. A lieutenant of the Royal Marine Artillery (George Dare Dowell) came to his assistance, when with three volunteers, he took off the crew from the cutter, rescued Ingouville from the water and then towed the stricken boat out of gun range.

Ingouville Place in Saint Helier in Jersey, is named after him.

Citation
The citation reads:

Ingouville's VC can be seen in the Maritime Museum on the New North Quay in St Helier, Jersey.

References

1826 births
1869 deaths
Victoria Cross recipients from Jersey
Burials at sea
Royal Navy sailors
Crimean War recipients of the Victoria Cross
Royal Navy personnel of the Crimean War
Royal Navy recipients of the Victoria Cross
Recipients of the Conspicuous Gallantry Medal
People from Saint Saviour, Jersey